The 1997–98 Women's National Cricket League season was the second season of the Women's National Cricket League, the women's domestic limited overs cricket competition in Australia. The tournament started on 11 October 1997 and finished on 15 February 1998. Defending champions New South Wales Breakers won the tournament after finishing second on the ladder at the conclusion of the group stage and beating South Australian Scorpions by two games to one in the finals series.

Ladder

Fixtures

1st final

2nd final

3rd final

References

 
Women's National Cricket League seasons
 
Women's National Cricket League